North Dakota Highway 17 (ND 17) is a  east–west highway stretching from just east of Barton to the Minnesota border at the Red River of the North. It is 139 miles in length and its alignment was established in 1939.

Route description
North Dakota Highway 17 begins at an intersection with ND 3 and ND 60 east of Barton in Pierce County. It heads east for fifteen miles before entering the small community of Wolford. Ten miles farther east, the highway enters Towner County. Thirteen miles east of the county line, the route intersects US 281 and enters the city of Cando. Eleven miles east of Cando, the road enters Ramsey County. Four miles east, ND 17 begins a four-mile concurrency with ND 20. After heading south for two miles, the concurrency reaches Starkweather. Two miles farther south, the concurrency with ND 20 ends. ND 17 heads east for twenty miles and enters Edmore. Three miles east of Edmore, the highway intersects ND 1. Three more miles east, the route enters Walsh County. Nine miles east of the county line, ND 17 serves as the northern terminus of ND 35. Two miles east of this intersection, the route enters Adams. The route heads ten miles east and intersects ND 32. Five miles east, the road enters the city of Park River. After heading east for six miles, ND 17 heads north for a mile during a short concurrency with ND 18. About nine miles east of the concurrency, the route enters the city of Grafton. In central Grafton, ND 17 forms a very short concurrency with US 81 which remains inside the city limits. Ten miles east of Grafton, the highway shares an interchange with Interstate 29. The highway then heads east for a mile and a half more before crossing the Red River of the North and entering Marshall County, Minnesota. The highway is continued farther east as Minnesota State Highway 317.

History
The first alignment of North Dakota Highway 17 was put into place in 1939, like many other state highways. The alignment passed through Grafton on 5th Street, taking a northern route through the city. In either the late 1950s or the early 1960s, state officials modified the route to take 12th Street through Grafton, a more southern route. Besides that, ND 17 has remained in its original alignment.

Major intersections

References

017